David Neil Salathiel (born 19 November 1962) is a Welsh former professional footballer who played as a defender. He made over 300 appearances in the English Football League for Wrexham and Crewe Alexandra.

Career

Salathiel was signed by Wrexham from the Sheffield Wednesday youth team. However, he only made four appearances for the club before leaving for Crewe Alexandra in 1981.

Salathiel then signed for South African club Arcadia Shepherds, but returned to Wrexham after less than a year, where he would spend 7 years, making 240 league appearances for the Welsh club.

After leaving Wrexham in 1990, he became a journeyman, playing for 9 different clubs in 10 years, including making over 50 appearances in the League of Wales.

References

Living people
1962 births
Welsh footballers
Footballers from Wrexham
Association football defenders
Wrexham A.F.C. players
Crewe Alexandra F.C. players
Arcadia Shepherds F.C. players
AFC Telford United players
Northwich Victoria F.C. players
Newtown A.F.C. players
Bangor City F.C. players
Mold Alexandra F.C. players
Brymbo F.C. players
Flint Town United F.C. players
Oswestry Town F.C. players
Holywell Town F.C. players
English Football League players
Cymru Premier players